Galdós is a Spanish surname. Notable people with the surname include:

Aitor Galdós (born 1979), Spanish professional road bicycle racer
Benito Pérez Galdós (1843–1920), Spanish realist novelist
Francisco Galdós (born 1947), former Spanish professional road racing cyclist
Sergio Galdós (born 1990), Peruvian professional tennis player

Spanish-language surnames